KNP  may refer to:
Katipunan ng Nagkakaisang Pilipino, a political party in the Philippines
Koalisyon ng Nagkakaisang Pilipino, a political alliance in the Philippines
Kayan National Party, a political party in Myanmar
Kenya National Party, a defunct political party in Kenya
Catholic National Party (Katholieke Nationale Partij), a defunct political party in Netherlands
Kinabalu National Park, Sabah, Malaysia
Congress of the New Right (Kongres Nowej Prawicy), a political party in Poland
Kismayo National Park, a national park in Kismayo, Somalia
Korean National Police, the police of South Korea
Korps Nationale Politie, the Dutch police
Kamala Nehru Park, a park in Pune, India